The 1958 Florida State Seminoles football team represented Florida State University in the 1958 NCAA University Division football season. 1958 was the beginning of the longstanding rivalry with the Florida Gators. The Gators won the first meeting by a score of 21–7.

Schedule

Roster
QB Joe Majors, Jr.

References

Florida State
Florida State Seminoles football seasons
Florida State Seminoles football